Lapid may refer to:

Lapid (surname)
Lapid, Israel
 Type of boat also known as a Balangay
 Ha-Lapid, Jewish Portuguese newspaper

See also